Humberto Calzada (born May 25, 1944, in Havana) is a Cuban-American artist living in Miami, Florida, since 1960.

Life in America

Calzada's family left Cuba shortly after the communist takeover of Fidel Castro, on October 11, 1960. He attended and graduated from Coral Gables Senior High School. He would later attend the University of Miami where he graduated as an Industrial Engineering in 1966, and the University of Miami where he also earned an MBA in Finance in 1968.

In 1976, Calzada decided to pursue painting as a full-time career. The subject of most of his art is the architecture of Cuba particularly Havana's colonial and neo-classical architecture.

Calzada's work is in numerous museums as well as in private, corporate, and public collections. In 2006, the Lowe Art Museum at the University of Miami presented a thirty-year Retrospective of his work titled "Humberto Calzada: In Dreams Awake." Calzada resides in Miami.

Periods

Humberto Calzada's art can, generally, be divided into phases or categories, but not into periods. They are phases in the sense that, during a specific time he painted primarily that category of painting, though not to the exclusion of all else. But they are "categories" in the sense that, throughout his career, he has produced works that have characteristics of any of the different classifications or will revisit any past phase. The general major classifications are:

The Anecdotal Period paintings. Paintings of a more personal nature painted in a detailed but casual style, based on memories of his home, places he knew and visited in Cuba, and other specific recollections.
The Surreal Theatrical Scenarios paintings.  Extracting elements of Cuban architecture and placing them out of context in an unlikely setting.
Meta-Art paintings. An extension of the theatrical scenarios but incorporating his past works in the walls as one more element.
The Gardens paintings. Ruins, incomplete buildings, but still recognizable as Cuban architecture of the neo-classical period.
Still Life paintings. Brief period in which architectural elements were arranged as classical still life painting.
"Years of" Paintings. These are the flooded spaces, which consist mostly of houses in which the ocean waters have entered.  It is one of his favorite iconographies because water has a dual meaning: it can mean total destruction, but it can also mean rebirth.
Tributes to other painters. Paintings which can either be Calzada in subject but another painter in technique or style or a Calzada painting in which the work of another painter is either hung or displayed in the space portrayed.
The Night paintings. Paintings of architectural and/or landscape themes at night.
La Hora Azul paintings. Paintings of architectural and/or landscape themes during the dusk hours.
The swimming pool paintings or Cuba circa 2025 painting. An optimistic assumption that in the not-too-distant futures, Cuba will not only have houses in good repair, but also houses with swimming pools.
The Reconstructing Havana paintings. A much-enlarged photograph of current private and public buildings in Havana is partially "reconstructed" by painting in what once was and what, someday, could be again.

Exhibitions

Solo
Solo exhibits of Calzada's artwork between 1975 and 2006.

2006–1990
 Lowe Art Museum, University of Miami, A Thirty-Year. Retrospective", Miami, Florida USA
 University of Miami, Bacardi Gallery, "Cuba: La Hora Azul", Miami, Florida USA
 Galeria Arteconsult, "Cuba y la Noche II", Panama City, Panama
 Jose Alonso Fine Arts, "Cuba y la Noche," Miami, Florida USA
 Jose Alonso Fine Arts, "Humberto Calzada: New Collection of Graphic Work," Miami, Florida., USA
 Corbino Galleries, "Sanctuaries for the Spirit" Longboat Key, Florida, USA
 Galeria Arteconsult, Panama City, Panama
 Museo Ixchel, Ciudad Guatemala, Guatemala
 Galería Amalia Mahoney, Chicago, Illinois, USA
 Galería Acquavella, Caracas, Venezuela
 Freites-Revilla Gallery, Boca Raton, Florida, USA
 Galería Arteconsult, Panama City, Panama
 Galería Forum de Las Artes, San Juan, P.R.
 Corbino Galleries, Sarasota, Florida, USA
 The America's Collection, Coral Gables, Florida, USA
 Freites-Revilla Gallery, Boca Raton, Florida, USA
 Corbino Galleries, Sarasota, Florida, USA
 The America's Collection, Coral Gables, Florida, USA
 Museo de Arte Contemporáneo. Panama City, Panama
 Kennesaw State College Art Gallery, Marietta, Georgia, USA
 Galería 1.2.3, San Salvador, El Salvador
 Bass Museum of Art, "Fifteen Years Retrospective," Miami Beach, Florida USA
 Corbino Galleries, Sarasota, Florida., USA
 Fred Snitzer Gallery, Coral Gables, Florida., USA
 Gloria Luria Gallery, Bay Harbor Islands, Florida USA
 Galería Arteconsult, Panama City, Panama

1990–1975
 Galería 1.2.3., San Salvador, El Salvador
 Corbino Galleries, Sarasota, Florida USA
 Galería 9, Lima, Peru
 Park Gallery, Fort Lauderdale, Florida USA
 Galería 1.2.3., San Salvador, El Salvador
 Galería Acquavella, Caracas, Venezuela
 Corbino Galleries, Sarasota, Florida USA
 Galería Arte Actual, Santiago, ChiLe
 Corbino Galleries, Sarasota, Florida USA
 Gallery Camino Real, Boca Raton, Florida USA
 Gutierrez Fine Arts, Key Biscayne, Florida USA
 Galería Etcetera, Panama City, Panama
 Galería 1.2.3., San Salvador, El Salvador
 Galería 9, Lima, Peru
 Baumgartner Galleries, Washington, D.C USA
 Forma Gallery, Coral Gables, Florida USA
 Galería 1.2.3., San Salvador, El Salvador
 Savannah College of Art & Design, Savannah, Georgia USA
 Galería Coabey, San Juan, Puerto Rico
 Galería Etcetera, Panama City, Panama
 Forma Gallery, Coral Gables, Florida USA 1978/79/80/81/82
 Galería Coabey, San Juan, P.R.
 Bacardi Art Gallery, Miami, Florida USA

Collective
Shared exhibits of Calzada's artwork between 1978 and 2010.

2010–2000

 Beaux Arts Gallery, Miami International Art Fair, Miami Beach, Florida USA
 Beaux Arts Gallery, Art Palm Beach, West Palm Beach, Florida USA
 Polk Museum of Art, Works by Artists of Cuban Ancestry From the Permanent Collection, Lakeland, Florida USA
 Iris and B. Gerald Cantor Art Gallery, Co-Sponsored by The Holy Cross Latin American and Latino Studies Concentration, "Layers: Collecting Cuban-American Art."
 Boca Raton Museum of Art, "Masters of Latin America: Selections from the Joan and Milton Bagley Collection, Boca Raton, Florida
 Cuba Art New York, New York "A Sense of Space: Cuban Artists and Architecture"
 University of Buffalo Art Gallery, Center for the Arts, ""Layers: Collecting Cuban-American Art"
 Miami Art Central, Cisneros Fontanals Art Foundation, "Hope and Glory: The Enduring Legacy of Oscar B. Cintas"
 King Fine Arts "Three Cuban Masters, Three Visions of One Reality," New York
 Kendall Campus Art Gallery, MDCC, "Art Trends: Miami's Trek III: A Decade of Art in Miami", Miami, Florida
 Lowe Art Museum, "From Modern to Contemporary: Cuban and Cuban- American Art From the Permanent Collection," Coral Gables, Florida
 Galería Arte Consult, "Memoria: Veinte Años," Panama, Republic of Panama
 Illinois Department of Commerce and Community Affairs, "Images and Reflections," Springfield, Illinois.

2000–1990
 "Breaking Barriers: Contemporary Cuban Art"  Art Museum of Ft. Lauderdale, Florida.
 Tampa Museum of Art, Tampa, Florida. USA
 Galeria 1.2.3., "Latin American Art Biennial," San Salvador, El Salvador
 Miami University Art Museum, "Changing Images from the Americas," Oxford, Ohio
 Museum of Art, "Cuban Artists of the Twentieth Century," Ft Lauderdale, Florida USA
 Museu de Arte Moderna, "Eco Art," Rio de Janeiro, Brazil
 "CUBA - U.S.A.: The First Generation"
 Museum of Contemporary Art, Chicago, Illinois USA
 Fondo del Sol, Washington, D.C. USA
 Minnesota Museum of American Art, St. Paul, Minn USA
 The Museum at Florida International University, Miami, Florida USA
 Museum of Art, "South Florida Invitational," Fort Lauderdale, Florida USA
 Northwood Institute, "Leading Hispanic Artists of South FLorida," West Palm Beach, Florida USA
 Main Library, Metro-Dade Cultural Center, "Miami Artists—Fifty Years of  Collecting," Miami, Florida USA

1990–1980
 "MIRA! Canadian Club Hispanic Art Tour III":
 Art Museum of the Americas, (OAS, Organization of American States) "Hispanic-American Artists of the United States," Washington, D.C. USA
 Municipal Art Center, Los Angeles, California USA
 Meadows Museum and Sculpture Court, Dallas, Texas USA
 Bass Museum of Art, Miami Beach, Florida USA
 Terra Museum of American Art, Chicago, Illinois USA
 Museo del Barrio, New York USA
 Museo Nacional de Bellas Artes, "Acquisitions from the Last 10 Years," Santiago, República de Chile
 "Latin American Artists from the Southeast Coastal Region": Contemporary Art Center, New Orleans, Louisiana USA
 The Art and Culture Center of Hollywood, Hollywood, Florida USA
 National Library of Canada, "Cuban Artists in North America," Ottawa, Canada
 "Outside Cuba/ Fuera de Cuba": Jane Zimmerli Art Museum, New Brunswick, New Jersey USA
 Museum of Contemporary Hispanic Art, New York USA
 Miami University Art Museum, Oxford, Ohio USA
 Museo de Arte de Ponce, Ponce, Puerto Rico
 Center for the Fine Arts, Miami, Florida USA
 Atlanta College of Art, Atlanta, Georgia USA
 Georgia State University Art Gallery,  "Visual Arts: the Southeast Atlanta, Georgia USA
 Stedman Art Gallery, "Rutgers National 85/86, Works on Paper," Rutgers University, Camden, New Jersey USA
 Thomas Center Gallery, "Expatriates:Paintings by 15 Young Latin American Artists," GainesvILle, Florida USA
 Instituto Cultural Domecq, "V Bienal Iberoamericana de Arte," Mexico D.F., Mexico
 South Campus Art Gallery, "American Artists of Cuban Origin,"Miami-Dade Community College, Miami, Florida
 Cuban Museum of Arts and Culture, "The Miami Generation," Miami, Florida USA
 Meridian House International, Washington, D.C. USA
 The Balch Institute, Philadelphia, Pennsylvania USA
 "VI Latin American Graphics Biennial Exhibition" San Juan, Puerto Rico
 North Miami Museum and Art Center, "Five in FLorida Plus Two," North Miami, Florida USA
 Museum of Art, "Hort Memorial Exhibition," Fort Lauderdale, Florida USA
 Gallery Camino Real, "Five Contemporary Realists," Boca Raton, Florida USA
 Art Museum of the Americas (OAS, Organization of American States) "Recent Acquisitions," Washington, D.C. USA
 "IV Biennial Art Exhibition of Medellín," Medellín, Colombia
 Moss Gallery, "Contemporary Cuban Painting," San Francisco, California USA

1980–1970
 "The Cuban Exhibition," De Armas Gallery, Editorial America, Miami, Florida USA
 Lowe Art Museum "Latin American Artists of the Southeastern United States", Coral Gables, Florida USA

Public and corporate collections

Archer M. Huntington Art Gallery, University of Texas at Austin, Texas
Art Museum, Fort Lauderdale, Florida
Art Museum of the Americas, Organization of American States (OAS), Washington, D.C.
Bass Museum of Art, Miami Beach, Florida
Centro de Arte Fundacion Ortiz-Guardian, Granada, Nicaragua
Lehigh University Art Galleries, Bethlehem, Pennsylvania
Lowe Art Museum, University of Miami, Coral Gables, Florida
Meadows Museum and Sculpture Court, Dallas, Texas
Miami University Museum, Oxford, Ohio
Museo de Arte Contemporaneo Maria Zambrana, Velez-Málaga, Spain
Museo de Arte Contemporaneo de Panama, Republica de Panama
Museo de Arte de Ponce, Ponce, PR
Museo Nacional de Bellas Artes, Santiago, Chile
Norton Gallery & School of Art, West Palm Beach, Florida
Polk Museum of Art, Lakeland, Florida
St. Louis Art Museum, St. Louis, Missouri
The Museum at Florida International University, Miami, Florida
The University Museum, Southern Illinois University at Edwardsville, Illinois
Zimmerli Art Museum, Rutgers University, New Brunswick, New Jersey
Florida International University, Primera Casa, Miami, Florida
University of Miami, Goizueta Pavilion, Coral Gables, Florida
Miami-Dade Community College South Campus Art Gallery, Miami, Florida
Miami-Dade County Department of Cultural Affairs, Art in Public Places Collection, Miami International Airport, Miami, Florida
Cintas Foundation, Institute of International Education, New York
Federal Reserve Bank of Atlanta, Miami Branch Office
Gulf & Western Industries, La Romana, Dominican Republic
Banco de Viscaya, Miami, Florida

Bibliography

 "Humberto Calzada" El Nuevo Herald, November 17, 1990, pp. 1D, 4D
 "Las Imágenes Diversas," El Nuevo Herald, June 24, 1992, p1 D, 4 D
 "Calzada: Edificaciones con Arte en el Arte," El Nuevo Herald, February 17, 1993, p. 4D
 "Calzada, Cada Vez Mejor," El Nuevo Herald, Seccion Viernes de Galeria, October 7, 1994, p. 29D
 "Exposicion de Humberto Calzada," El Nuevo Herald, Artes y Letras, AprIL 25,  1999, p. 2E
 "El Universo Fantastico de Humberto Calzada" El Nuevo Herald, Artes y Letras March 19, 2000, pp. 1E-2E
 "Humberto Calzada: Cuba y la Noche," El Nuevo Herald, Artes y Letras, March 18, 2001, p1-E.
 "Humberto Calzada: La Casa Ideal Para lo Cubano", El Nuevo Herald, Artes y Letras February 16, 2003, p. 1E
 "Humberto Calzada: Desde La Luz Azul", El Nuevo Herald, Artes y Letras, November 2, 2003, p. 1E

Documentaries

References 

1944 births
Living people
20th-century American painters
American male painters
21st-century American painters
Cuban painters
Cuban emigrants to the United States
20th-century American male artists